The Beautiful People is the fourth full-length album by Japanese reggae punk band SiM, released on April 6, 2016. It reached sixth place on the Oricon weekly chart and charted for 12 weeks.

The song from the album, "No Future", was featured in arcade game Mobile Suit Gundam Extreme Vs Maxi Boost ON opening. Their single "Existence" was used as Shingeki no Bahamut: Genesis anime theme song, while "Crows" used on Crows: BURNING EDGE PS4/PSVita game song. "Existence" peaked at #20 on Billboard Japan Hot 100 and "Crows" reached #18 on Billboard Japan Hot 100, stayed for 2 weeks.

Track listing
All tracks written by MAH.

Personnel
 Manabu Taniguti (MAH) — vocals
 Masahira Iida (SHOW-HATE) — guitars, keyboards
 Shinya Shinohara (SIN) — bass guitar
 Yuya Taniguchi (GODRi) — drums

References

External links
Discogs. SiM – The Beautiful People

2016 albums
SiM (band) albums